Akash Vukoti is an Indian-American spelling child prodigy and TV personality from San Angelo, Texas. He was the first-ever first grader to qualify for and compete in the Scripps National Spelling Bee, and first appeared in the NBC TV show Little Big Shots in March 2016.

Academic achievements 

Vukoti competed in his first spelling bee when he was 2 years old. He was inducted into American Mensa at the age of 3 and became a Davidson Young Scholar at the age of 5. He became the first-ever first grader to compete in the history of the Scripps National Spelling Bee at the age of 6 years, in 2016. He also competed in the 2018, 2019 and 2021, and 2022 Scripps National Spelling Bees. Vukoti won the 34th San Angelo Area Spelling Bee on February 11, 2023, and will be competing in the Scripps National Spelling Bee in May 2023 for a record 6th time.

Television shows & media coverages 
Vukoti was featured on several TV shows, such as Little Big Shots in Season 1 (2016), Season 2 (2017) and Little Big Shots UK (Episode 4) in 2017. He was also featured on the Steve Harvey talk show, Jimmy Kimmel Live!, and The Preachers in 2016. He appeared as a guest on the Harry show in 2017. Akash was also featured on The Kelly Clarkson Show on November 10, 2020.

On September 25, 2018, Vukoti was announced as one of the celebrities who would compete on Dancing with the Stars: Juniors, a spin-off of Dancing with the Stars. His professional partner was Kamri Peterson and the couple were mentored by Witney Carson. The trio were eliminated 7th from the competition on November 18, 2018.

Vukoti was interviewed live on CNN International from Hong Kong and CTV from Canada in 2016. He was interviewed on Australia’s The Morning Show of Seven Network in 2019 and again in 2021, and by TV9 Telugu in Hyderabad, India on January 14, 2020. Vukoti runs his YouTube channel, which has garnered over 750,000 subscribers and over 100 million views as of March 2023. Vukoti has also done commercials for IBM, Amazon Kindle and the Scripps National Spelling Bee.

Documentaries and films 
Vukoti has been featured in HBO and BBC documentaries. Episode 231 of Real Sports with Bryant Gumbel titled “Brain Games and Mental Athletes” featured Vukoti and aired on June 21, 2016, on HBO. The BBC documentary The Human Body: Secrets of Your Life Revealed showcased Vukoti's talent in the episode "Learn" and aired on October 9, 2017, on BBC Two.

He has been featured in the award-winning documentary film Spelling the Dream, which released on Netflix on June 3, 2020, in over 190 countries. The film has generated positive reviews from around the world.

Filmography

Film

Television

Awards

Personal life 
Akash Vukoti is the son of Chandrakala Jandyam and Dr. Krishna M Vukoti, who immigrated to the United States from Andhra Pradesh, India. Akash has an elder sister Amrita, who is also a Davidson Young Scholar and a member of Mensa. Both Amrita and Akash Vukoti competed in the 2019 Scripps National Spelling Bee.

Philanthropy 
Vukoti has donated to various non-profit organizations like Children's Miracle Network in San Angelo, Wikipedia, Hurricane Harvey Relief Fund, Telangana CM Relief Fund, Water.org and Kerala Floods Relief Fund. He has also donated to Bharat Ke Veer, an Indian government initiative supporting the families of deceased Central Armed Police Forces and Assam Rifles personnel. Vukoti has also donated to non-profit organizations the American Red Cross Society and the Government of India's PM CARES Fund to help fight the COVID-19 pandemic.

References

Living people
American people of Telugu descent
People from Rockville, Maryland
2009 births
American television personalities